Chishang and may refer to the following locations in China or Taiwan:

 (池上镇), in Boshan District, Zibo, Shandong
Chishang, Taitung (池上鄉), township in Taitung County, Taiwan
Chishang Station (池上車站), railroad station in Chishang Township, on the Hualien–Taitung Line